Now Bahar-e Gholaman (also Romanized as Now Bahār-e Gholāmān; also known as Now Bahār and Naubahār) is a village in Bakharz Rural District, in the Central District of Bakharz County, Razavi Khorasan Province, Iran. At the 2006 census, its population was 326, in 74 families.

References 

Populated places in Bakharz County